Harold E. "Bud" Foster, (May 30, 1906 – July 16, 1996) was an American basketball player and coach. He is a member of the Naismith Memorial Basketball Hall of Fame. Foster prepped at Mason City, Iowa and went on to play at the University of Wisconsin–Madison from 1926 to 1930.  While a player at Wisconsin, he was voted twice All Big Ten Conference and helped lead Wisconsin to a 43–8 three year record. He was born in Newton, Kansas.

After college, Foster played professionally with the Oshkosh All-Stars. He teamed up with fellow Big Ten star (and also a future Hall of Famer) Branch McCracken to lead the All-Stars to a 30–23 victory over the Chicago Majestic and the Midwest professional championship.  He went on to play with pro teams in Milwaukee and Chicago.

After his playing career, Foster was named freshman coach of basketball at Wisconsin in 1933.  He succeeded Doc Meanwell as head coach a year later, and remained as head coach until 1959.  His Wisconsin team won the 1941 NCAA championship.

Foster served as president of the National Association of Basketball Coaches and was a member of the Basketball Rules Committee from 1957–1966.

Foster's 266 wins remained the most in Wisconsin history until Bo Ryan passed him in 2012; his 267 losses remain a school record.

After coaching the Wisconsin Badgers, Foster broadcast the Badger Basketball games, sharing the booth with Ted Moore.

Awards
In addition to his induction in the National Basketball Hall of Fame (1964), Foster is a member of the University of Wisconsin Athletics Hall of Fame (1991) as well as the State of Wisconsin Athletic Hall of Fame (1970), Madison Sports Hall of Fame (1966) and Helms Athletic Foundation Hall of Fame.

Head coaching record

See also
 List of NCAA Division I Men's Final Four appearances by coach

References

External links
 

1906 births
1996 deaths
All-American college men's basketball players
American men's basketball coaches
American men's basketball players
Basketball coaches from Kansas
Basketball players from Kansas
College men's basketball head coaches in the United States
Naismith Memorial Basketball Hall of Fame inductees
National Collegiate Basketball Hall of Fame inductees
Oshkosh All-Stars players
People from Mason City, Iowa
People from Newton, Kansas
Wisconsin Badgers men's basketball coaches
Wisconsin Badgers men's basketball players